B-Daman Crossfire, known in Japan as Cross Fight B-Daman (クロスファイトビーダマン),  is the first B-Daman anime of the Cross Fight series and the seventh B-Daman anime series, overall. Premiering on October 2, 2011 in Japan, it became the first B-Daman anime to air in almost five years, following the finale of Crash B-Daman on December 25, 2006.  The series began airing on TV Tokyo in Japan starting October 2, 2011 and ended September 30, 2012.

The anime only takes up half an average time slot for a TV show in Japan, meaning that they only last around 11 minutes in a whole episode; however, in international airings two back-to-back episodes were connected to make an average time slot of 30 minutes.

Episode list

References

External links
The B-Daman Wiki Forums, a community dedicated to B-Daman

B-Daman
B-Daman